Pickup artists (PUA), self-identified as dating coaches, the seduction community or the pickup community, is a movement of men (or women) whose goal is seduction and sexual success. The community exists through Internet newsletters and blogs, marketing (e.g. banner ads, seminars, one-on-one coaching), forums and groups, as well as local clubs, known as "lairs".

The rise of "seduction science", "game", "rizz",  or "studied charisma" has been attributed to modern forms of dating and social norms between sexes which have developed from a perceived increase in the equality of women in western society and changes to traditional gender roles.  Commentators in the media have described "game" as sexist or misogynistic.

History
Modern pickup artist practice dates at least to 1970, with the publication of How to Pick Up Girls! by Eric Weber. However, one self-described "picker-upper of women" preceding Weber was rational emotive psychotherapist Albert Ellis, who wrote The Art of Erotic Seduction in 1967 with Roger Conway. It is a how-to guide for men that encourages them to meet women through the "pickup".

In 1991, Ross Jeffries taught workshops, promoted a collection of neuro-linguistic programming (NLP) techniques called "speed seduction" (SS), and published a short book of his techniques, How to Get the Women You Desire into Bed. Other exponents established themselves in roughly the same era, but lacked contacts with each other. In 1994, Lewis De Payne, then a student of Jeffries, founded the newsgroup alt.seduction.fast (ASF). This then spawned a network of other Internet discussion forums, email lists, blogs, and sites where seduction techniques could be exchanged.

In the late 1990s, Clifford Lee began his Cliff's List Seduction Letter as a central independent voice of the community.

Other pickup teachers emerged with competing methods, and became known within this community as "seduction gurus" or "gurus".

The community was brought to greater mainstream awareness with the 1999 drama film Magnolia, in which Tom Cruise portrayed a charismatic yet embittered and emotionally-troubled pickup guru who was loosely modeled on Ross Jeffries.

In 2005, journalist Neil Strauss published The Game: Penetrating the Secret Society of Pickup Artists, an exposé of the PUA community. The Game reached the New York Times Bestseller List, and made pickup techniques known to a wider audience. The community was further publicized with the television show The Pick Up Artist (2007–2008) on VH1.

Within the community, seduction lairs are underground meeting groups for men devoted to the study of obtaining sex taught in the seduction community. Lairs first began as study groups soon after Ross Jeffries released his first products and began teaching sometime in the early 1990s. A "lair" typically involves two elements: an online forum and group meetings.

Concepts 
Many pickup artists work on their "game" by improving their understanding of psychology, their confidence and self-esteem ─ collectively termed "inner game" ─ and their social skills and physical appearance (physical fitness, fashion sense, grooming) ─ collectively termed the "outer game". Many members of the community believe that one's "game" is refined through regular practice, with the idea that the abilities needed to interact in this way with women can be improved.

Pickup artists have a set of acronyms and jargon for describing male–female dynamics and social interaction.  For example, "average frustrated chump" (AFC) is a term coined by Ross Jeffries to describe males who are typically clueless and incompetent with women.

Theory 
The original Jeffries' version of pickup is based on neuro-linguistic programming (NLP), a theory that claims existence of a connection between neurological processes, language and behavioural patterns learned through experience. This version of pickup supposes that one can model a person to obtain their skills. But, according to scientific consensus, NLP is a pseudoscience and its methods have no evidenciary base.

Jeffries proposes to imitate seduction experts to obtain their skills and attract women's attention, and founds his claims on NLP. More modern pickup gurus gave up his strongest claims, while still using basic elements of NLP.

The pickup community has a special terminology, which allows to distinguish the initiated. Pickup terms are borrowed from the everyday English vocabulary or from special areas like business terminology, thus are quite transparent for novices.

Pickup terminology is mostly based on the following kinds of terminology:
 Military terminology: for example, a woman one seduces is called a target;
 Sports  terminology: for example, a process of seduction is called a game;
 Business terminology: for example, there are seduction strategies of raising own value and lowering her value.

The borrowing of the terminology corresponds to the process called framing, which means re-contextualization of a situation within the perspective of another situation, like sports training. In the process of framing the terms from several different domains are used. It can be considered as a metaphorical translation from one situation to another. The framing is also used to reduce tension of the need to succeed, because in the training, there is no problem in failure.

Pickup artist
A pickup artist (commonly abbreviated PUA) is a person who practices finding multiple sexual partners. Such a person purportedly abides by a certain system deemed effective by that community in his attempts to seduce partners.

The use of pickup in this context, slang for making a casual acquaintance with a stranger in anticipation of sexual relations, was popularized by the 1970 book How to Pick Up Girls by Eric Weber, and by Pick-Up Times, a short-lived 1970s magazine, and the 1987 semi-autobiographical romantic comedy The Pick-up Artist, written and directed by James Toback. More recent works of pickup artist culture include Neil Strauss's book, The Game: Penetrating the Secret Society of Pickup Artists, and the 2007 VH1 reality television series, The Pickup Artist, starring the pickup artist Mystery. The former pickup artist Roosh V, who has since recanted his past and converted to Oriental Orthodox Christianity, previously had self-published 14 books describing techniques for seducing women. According to Salon, such books are the "cash cow" of the pickup industry.

The term pickup artist is also associated with a male heterosexual subculture which strives to improve sexual success with women. Routines and gambits are developed to stimulate purported "attraction switches", sometimes combined with mental-conditioning techniques such as neuro-linguistic programming. Members aim to improve their seductive capabilities through the development of various lifestyles. The culture surrounding pickup has spawned an entire industry servicing those who want to improve their social and seduction skills with consultations and in-field training.

Pickup artists receive mixed to negative responses from the press and general public, with many regarding both the practice and theory as immoral, sexist and ineffective. In 2014, following widely supported public petitions, U.S.-based PUA speaker and instructor Julien Blanc was denied entry to both the United Kingdom and Australia after he published YouTube videos explaining and demonstrating behaviors such as grabbing women by the throat, and forcing their heads towards his crotch.

Pickup artists have also been parodied, as in the March 2011 The Scott Mills Show. BBC Radio 1 debated Neil Strauss' The Game on many shows.

Psychologist Petra Boynton has stated that there is "no evidence of effectiveness" for any claims of pickup artists.  Research by Nathan Oesch of the University of Oxford Department of Experimental Psychology, however, confirmed attraction and seduction principles, as described in Strauss' books on the subject, do have a factual basis in social, physiological and evolutionary psychology.

Practices 

There are a variety of PUA "schools of thought" that promote numerous different methods. These range from approaches that are very indirect, and stress starting with casual conversation before building into a flirt, to methods in which attraction is communicated very openly and directly. Most PUAs acknowledge the distinction between so-called "inner game" and "outer game", where the former relates to techniques directed towards increasing one's self-confidence and mindset, whilst the latter are about actual interaction with real people. Inner game may involve taking greater care in one's looks and presentation, identifying and neutralising self-defeating mental habits (also known as "limiting beliefs"), and developing mental routines to build confidence. Outer game involves actual interaction with individuals and groups of people, from body language to conversation. The pick-up artist may frequent a self-help group and converse with MRA's (men's rights activists), incels (involuntary celibates), and other PUA's to discuss techniques.

In The Game, Neil Strauss documents various practices among pickup artists.  Members of the community believe in achieving success with women through putatively scientific and empirical means, rather than by relying on good looks or instinct, or by following societal courtship conventions. The practice of going out with the purpose of meeting women is known as "sarging", a term coined by Ross Jeffries, after his cat "Sarge". A pickup artist can "sarge" alone, or with a wingman.

Jeffries employed neuro-linguistic programming techniques for the purposes of sexual conquest, although Strauss claims in The Game that NLP was quickly rendered obsolete by the rise of techniques based on social dynamics, particularly Erik von Markovik's "Mystery Method". The Mystery Method describes seduction as a linear process involving three stages (establishing attraction, building comfort, and seduction) each of which involves a variety of techniques.

"Negging", one of von Markovik's most famous and controversial techniques, has been described as the practice of giving a woman a backhanded compliment such as "nice nails – are they real?", to weaken her confidence and therefore render her more vulnerable to seduction, or that depriving a woman of obsequious validation and attention will influence her to seek it from the man who negs her. Strauss refers to negs as "disqualifiers" in his book Rules of the Game, emphasizing that the primary purpose of using a neg is not to put a woman down, but for a man to disqualify himself as a potential suitor, thereby allowing for interaction to start on less loaded terms. Conor Friedersdorf lambasted the use of negging by pick-up artists, but admitted that, based on his observations, negging did appear to be effective at generating attraction from some women.

"Pawning" is trading or discarding an unwanted woman as proof of the PUA's own social value, and "going caveman" is escalating physical contact while reducing verbal contact.

One constellation of PUA techniques, called "Last Minute Resistance" tactics (LMR tactics), is designed to convince a woman to have sex after she has indicated that she does not want to. This includes tactics from those which are mutually beneficial – such as being okay with the woman being on her period – to "callous manipulation" and rape.

Approaching and opening 
Pickup artists generally assume the mindset that men should lead and initiate contacts and plans in general in order to be more attractive, and that women will not generally initiate contact although they want men to, requiring men to begin any interaction by approaching them, but many have also cultivated a sensitivity to direct and indirect signals of possible sexual interest.

Pickup artists often practice approaching and opening repetitively; some have done thousands of approaches. Strauss describes a pickup artist who did 125 approaches in one day.

The "Mystery Method" encourages approaching groups of strangers, starting indirect conversations, and giving attention to all members of the group without initiating conversation with the "target" until attraction has been established.

Criticism 
Having a notorious reputation outside the community, the PUA movement has been described as sexist, misogynistic and pseudoscientific.

Roosh V has been called hateful and a misogynist for his views on women and sex by the Southern Poverty Law Center, and accused of rape advocacy and multiple instances of rape depicted in his books.

Feminist BDSM writer and activist Clarisse Thorn, author of Confessions of a Pickup Artist Chaser: Long Interviews with Hideous Men, criticizes the PUA community as frequently "absurd and sexist", "pushy and problematic" and encouraging adversarial gender roles. However, she also argues that PUA tactics are worth understanding because they are not unique to the PUA community, but instead represent society-wide beliefs and patterns and strategies of human sexual behaviour. Other dating coaches, such as Sebastian Harris, publicly speak against the misogynistic tendencies of pickup artists. The UCLA Center for the Study of Women argues that PUA culture is misogynistic, and exists on a continuum of sexist behaviours and attitudes that includes rape and murder.

Media coverage
Pickup artists have received increased media attention, since the publication of Strauss's article on the community in The New York Times, and his memoir The Game. Response has been varied; it has been called misogynistic, and a review of The Game in the San Francisco Chronicle characterized the community as "a puerile cult of sexual conquest", and calls its tactics "sinister" and "pathetic". According to the review, "if women in the book are sometimes treated as a commodity, they come out looking better than the men, who can be downright loathsome—and show themselves eventually to be pretty sad, dysfunctional characters".

Feminists tend to be critical of pickup artists. Beatrix Campbell has stated that The Game "sexually objectifies women", arguing that "Nowhere from its description do you get a sense of men being helped to be human in an easy and agreeable way...it's not about having any rapport or relationship... the only thing that will help them in relationships is empathy and liking women."

According to an article in Eye Weekly, some feminists believe that pickup "isn't just cheesy; it's offensive". The article cites a proposal put forward by a feministblogs.org writer as an alternative to the formula used by expert PUAs: "Shake my hand. [Say] 'Hi, my name is ...' Treat me like a human being. Avoid seeing women as conquests and men as competition."

An article in the Houston Press claimed that pickup artist activity "isn't the lechfest it might sound like". The article quotes the webmaster of confidentup.com defending the community: "It's no more deceptive than push-up bras or heels or going to the gym to work out...This isn't just a game of words and seduction, it's an overall life improvement." Strauss says, "I really think all of these routines and manipulations are just a way for a guy to get his foot in the door so that if a woman connects with him, she can still choose him," and that pickup techniques "can be used for good or evil!" He argues that "women are incredibly intuitive—the creepy guys with bad intentions don't do nearly as well as the guys who love and respect women".

Several writers describe observing pickup artists first-hand. Some women recount experiences with men they believed to be pickup artists who tried to "pick them up", and some men recount trying out pickup techniques. Catherine Townsend, writing for The Independent, describes a negative experience with a man she believed was a pickup artist and used a lot of "negs" on her: "The problem is that some guys clearly don't know when to quit."

An article in San Francisco Magazine recounts the experience of the blogger "Dolly", who is the author of the popular sex blog The Truth about Cocks and Dolls, with pickup artists. According to the article, Dolly was:

After spending three days immersed in a Mystery Method Corp (now Love Systems) seminar, Gene Weingarten expressed his uneasiness about "a step by step tutorial for men in how to pick up women, make them comfortable in your presence, and bed them, ideally within seven hours of your first meeting" and wondered aloud, "Is there something inherently wrong with the notion of sexual conquest as a classroom-taught skill, complete with a long hierarchy of 'lines' that work, seemingly spontaneous topics of conversation that are anything but spontaneous, tricks for seeming 'vulnerable', and tips on how to behave so as to deliver subtle but effective nonverbal inducements to intimacy?"

For an article for the Times Online, Hugo Rifkind participated in a seminar by Neil Strauss. Rifkind describes initially struggling with pickup techniques, eventually learning to attract women's interest, and then feeling guilty. Rifkind writes, "After a little more practice, my 'game' is improving dramatically. I can open with fluency, and there's an injection of confidence which comes from knowing exactly what you are going to say next." When he attracts a woman's attention, "she is—quite honestly—looking at me like I'm the most fascinating person she's ever met. As a human being and, perhaps more crucially, as somebody with a girlfriend, I feel like absolute scum."

Commercialization 
The media attention and rapid increase in pickup artists has led to commercialization and competition.  Gurus sell workshops, books, e-books, DVDs, CDs and online video courses and video-call mentoring over the Internet.  In The Game, Strauss describes the competition between gurus.  In The Journal, teaching of these methods is shown by way of 50+ examples.

Academic research
An academic paper on the community, published in 2012 by Eric C. Hendriks in the journal Cultural Analysis, details the value system guiding successful pickup artists based on an international study including participant observation of bootcamp and "lair" meetings in Germany. The article argues that the values of successful practitioners of the "Venusian arts" are informed by an intertwining of "hedonistic goals and diffused forms of innerworldly asceticism". According to Hendricks, the hedonistic goal of sexual satisfaction interacts in a complex fashion with a set of "disciplinarian and ascetic values", and the author stresses that these disciplinarian and ascetic values are central to the value system of performant practitioners, even though the marketing of gurus often promises an easy, effortless "quick fix".

Nathan Oesch from the University of Oxford Department of Experimental Psychology claims to have confirmed attraction and pickup principles, as described in Strauss' books on the subject, do have a factual basis in social, physiological and evolutionary psychology.

Andrew King's cultural history of the pickup artist in the journal Sexuality & Culture argues that, as a genre, the growth of PUA philosophy parallels the rise of feminism in academic and popular culture—and in some ways can be seen as a critique of its limitations, particularly the idea of gender egalitarianism.

Notable members 
Julien Blanc
Ross Jeffries
Neil Strauss
Erik von Markovik
Roosh V
Eric Weber

See also 

 Affiliative conflict theory
 Don Juanism
 Hookup culture
 Libertine
 Masculism
 Manosphere
 One-night stand
 Pick-up line
 Playboy lifestyle
 Promiscuity
 Rake (stock character)
 Sexual addiction
 Sexual capital

Notable books 

O'Neill, Rachel (2018). Seduction: Men, Masculinity and Mediated Intimacy. Wiley .

References 

Personal development
 
Sexology
Human communication
 
Misogyny